Agra Airport  is a military airbase and public airport serving the city of Agra, in the state of Uttar Pradesh, India. The air force station is one of the largest airbases of the Indian Air Force. On 15 August 2007, the airbase celebrated its sixtieth anniversary.

History
The station was opened during World War II as Royal Air Forces Station Agra and had a number of flying units located there. It was closed after the war and transferred to the Royal Indian Air Force. The prefix Royal was later dropped and the station was later renamed. Air Force Station Agra was established on 15 August 1947 and placed under the command of Wing Commander Shivdev Singh, who was the incumbent commander of the No. 12 Sqn. Based on the then present system of Commands, the airfield fell under the responsibility of the Western Air Command (WAC). The base remained under this Theatre Command for the next two decades. In July 1971 it was transferred to the Central Air Command (CAC), where it remains today.

During its sixty-year history with the IAF, it has seen the likes of C-47 Dakotas, C-119 Packets, HS 748 'Avros', AN-12s, AN-32s, IL-76s, Canberras, IL-78 MKI, and now the Airborne Early Warning and Control/AWACS.

The station now has the honour of holding the first inflight refueling aircraft Squadron in IAF service, with No. 78 ‘Mid Air Refuelling Squadron’ (MARS) Squadron flying the IL-78MKIs.

During World War II, the United States Army Air Forces Air Technical Service Command established a major maintenance and supply facility at Agra, named "Agra Air Depot". The 3rd Air Depot Group serviced a wide variety of fighter, bomber and transport aircraft being used by Tenth Air Force and the Allied ground forces in Burma and Fourteenth Air Force in China. The depot stockpiled large amounts of material for shipment over the Himalayan Mountains ("The Hump") by Air Transport Command cargo aircraft flying to forward airfields in China. It also was a major stopover point on the ATC Karachi-Kunming air transport route. The airport is mentioned in a chapter in Ernest Gann's Fate Is the Hunter, wherein he relays a story of coming with feet of destroying the Taj Mahal in a severely overloaded C-87 after takeoff.

Agra Air Force Station
No. 50 Squadron IAF has been tasked with the operations of the newly inducted Beriev A-50E/I Airborne Early Warning and Control (AWACS) aircraft. The AWACS has been mounted on a specially designed IL-76 with advanced avionics & telecommunication systems.

Airlines and destinations

See also
 List of airports in India
 List of the busiest airports in India
 Lal Bahadur Shastri International Airport

References

"Airfield Visits". Bharat-Rakshak.com. 2008.
"Indo-US air force transport exercise at Agra next year". The Hindu. 22 September 2008.
"Centre's vested interests preventing airport in Agra, says Akhilesh Yadav". India Today. 7 May 2016.

External links
 Agra Airport at the Airports Authority of India
 
 

Indian Air Force bases
Airports in Uttar Pradesh
Buildings and structures in Agra
Transport in Agra
World War II sites in India
Airports established in the 1940s
1940 establishments in India
20th-century architecture in India